Dave Gold (June 5, 1932 – April 22, 2013) was an American businessman who established the 99 Cents Only chain of discount stores.

Early life 
Gold was born in Cleveland, Ohio, to Russian Jewish immigrants who operated a general store.

His family moved to Los Angeles in 1945. Gold graduated from Los Angeles High School and began studies at Los Angeles City College, but dropped out to run his family's liquor store after his father had a heart attack.

Career 
Gold opened the first 99 Cents Only store in 1982. At the time, the dollar store concept was considered a retail graveyard for expired or broken products. Gold made his store bright and well organized and cultivated relationships with vendors, sometimes plying them with bagels and cream cheese.

Gold died in his home in the Mid-Wilshire area of Los Angeles from an apparent heart attack.

References

1932 births
2013 deaths
American people of Russian-Jewish descent
Retail company founders
American company founders
American businesspeople in retailing
Businesspeople from Los Angeles
Businesspeople from Cleveland
20th-century American businesspeople